Ueli is the Swiss hypocoristic form of the masculine given name Ulrich.
People with the given name Ueli include:

Ueli Bodenmann (born 1965), Swiss rower
Ueli Gegenschatz (1971–2009), Swiss skydiver
Ueli Kestenholz (born 1975), Swiss snowboarder
Ueli Matti (born 1959), Swiss slalom canoeist
Ueli Maurer (born 1950), Swiss politician
Ueli Maurer (cryptographer) (born 1960), Swiss cryptographer
Ueli Steck (1976–2017), Swiss mountain climber
Ueli Steiger (born 1954), Swiss cinematographer
Ueli Sutter (born 1947), Swiss cyclist
Ueli Wiget (born 1957), Swiss musician

Fictional character: 
Ueli (also Uli), eponymous protagonist in two novels by Jeremias Gotthelf (1846, 1849)

Swiss masculine given names